This is a list of governors of the United Provinces of British India. The establishment of the title of Governor of the United Provinces of British India happened in 1921 by renaming of title of Lieutenant Governor of the United Provinces of Agra and Oudh until it was renamed as Governor of the United Provinces in 1937.

Governors of the United Provinces of British India (1921–1937) 
In 1922, the office was upgraded to governor.
 Sir Spencer Harcourt Butler, 3 January 1921 – 21 December 1922, continued
 Sir Ludovic Charles Porter, 21 December 1922 – 24 December 1922, acting
 Sir William Sinclair Marris, 24 December 1922 – 14 January 1927
 Sir Samuel Perry O'Donnell, 13 August 1926 – 1 December 1926, acting for Marris
 Sir Alexander Phillips Muddiman, 14 June 1927 – 17 June 1928
 Sir William Malcolm Hailey, 9 August 1928 – 6 December 1934
 Sir George Bancroft Lambert, 16 October 1930 – 19 April 1931, acting for Hailey
 Nawab Sir Muhammad Ahmad Said Khan Chhatari, KCIE, MBE 8 April 1933 – 27 November 1933, acting for Hailey
 Sir Harry Graham Haig, 6 December 1934 – 1 April 1937

See also 
 (1732–1857) - Nawabs of Awadh
 (1834–1836) - Governors of Agra
 (1836–1877) - Lieutenant Governors of the North-Western Provinces
 (1856–1877) - Chief Commissioners of Oudh
 (1877–1902) - Lieutenant Governors of the North-Western Provinces and Chief Commissioners of Oudh
 (1902–1921) - Lieutenant Governors of the United Provinces of Agra and Oudh
 (1937–1950) - Governors of the United Provinces
 (1950 – cont.) - Governors of Uttar Pradesh

References 

 Provinces of British India
 The India List and India Office List By India Office, Great Britain

British administration in Uttar Pradesh
Governors